XXIII Corps was a corps of the Union Army during the American Civil War.  It served in the Western Theater as part of the Army of the Ohio.

The corps was organized in April 1863 by order of the departmental commander, Ambrose E. Burnside.  Along with Burnside's old IX Corps, which had been sent west with him after Fredericksburg, it was to maintain a primarily defensive position in Eastern Tennessee and Kentucky.  It originally consisted of two divisions under the overall command of General George L. Hartsuff.

The corps played a major role during the Knoxville Campaign, its first major action, distinguishing itself at the battles of Campbell's Station and Knoxville, and also took part in some minor actions in early 1864. During this time it was commanded by Maj. Gen. Mahlon D. Manson.

The Army of the Ohio joined William T. Sherman for the Atlanta Campaign that spring.  IX Corps was detached and sent back to rejoin the Army of the Potomac, so the "army" consisted entirely of XXIII Corps, now commanded by John M. Schofield.  It served ably if unspectacularly throughout the campaign.  

In the fall of 1864, it was sent north to counter John B. Hood's Franklin-Nashville Campaign, and it saw heavy action at the Battle of Franklin, though it was held in reserve at Nashville.  

After this campaign, the corps was sent east to serve in the Department of the South; it took part in the capture of Fort Fisher and the seizure of Wilmington, North Carolina (the last open port of the South).  During this time it was commanded by Maj. Gen. Jacob D. Cox.  The corps ultimately joined Sherman's army in the Carolinas Campaign, and was disbanded in August 1865.

Command history

* Cox commanded briefly May 26–28, 1864 and September 14 – October 22, 1864

References
Boatner, Mark M. III, The Civil War Dictionary: Revised Edition, David McKay Company, Inc., 1984.

External links 
XXIII Corps history

23
Military units and formations established in 1863
1863 establishments in the United States
Military units and formations disestablished in 1865
1865 disestablishments in the United States